Pogonatherum is a genus of Asian and oceanic island plants in the grass family.

 Species
 Pogonatherum biaristatum S.L.Chen & G.Y.Sheng - Hainan
 Pogonatherum crinitum (Thunb.) Kunth - Indian Subcontinent, China, Japan, southeast Asia, Papuasia, Marianas, Madagascar
 Pogonatherum paniceum (Lam.) Hack. - Saudi Arabia, Indian Subcontinent, China, southeast Asia, Papuasia
 Pogonatherum rufobarbatum Griff. - Assam

 Formerly included
see Arthraxon Eulalia Homozeugos Microstegium Polytrias Pseudopogonatherum

References

Andropogoneae
Poaceae genera